USS Halcyon may refer to the following ships of the United States Navy:

 , a patrol vessel commissioned 14 May 1917 and decommissioned 24 June 1919 which then served as a research vessel in the United States Bureau of Fisheries fleet as USFS Halcyon from 1919 to 1927
 , a patrol craft that served briefly in 1917
 , a patrol vessel in commission from 1917 to 1919.

United States Navy ship names